This is a list of wolves in fiction, including normal wolves and anthropomorphic wolf characters. For werewolf characters see List of werewolves.

Literature

Folk tale
The Boy Who Cried Wolf
The Goat and Her Three Kids
Little Red Riding Hood
The Three Little Pigs
The Wolf and the Seven Young Kids
Peter and the Wolf
The Wolf and the Crane
The Wolf in Sheep's Clothing
The Wolf and the Lamb

Film

Comics and manga

Television

Animation

Video games

Music
Ukrainian singer Ruslana's single Dance with the Wolves included a real wolf and an animated wolf and her puppies in the music videos.

Animatronics
Rolfe DeWolfe, a comedic wolf from The Rock-afire Explosion at Showbiz Pizza Place. He has a ventriloquist dummy named Earl Schmerle.

See also
Werewolf fiction
Wolfdog
List of wolves

References

Notes

Fictional wolves
Wolves